Thermonuclear fusion is the process of atomic nuclei combining or “fusing” using high temperatures to drive them close enough together for this to become possible. There are two forms of thermonuclear fusion: uncontrolled, in which the resulting energy is released in an uncontrolled manner, as it is in thermonuclear weapons ("hydrogen bombs") and in most stars; and controlled, where the fusion reactions take place in an environment allowing some or all of the energy released to be harnessed for constructive purposes.

Temperature requirements
Temperature is a measure of the average kinetic energy of particles, so by heating the material it will gain energy. After reaching sufficient temperature, given by the Lawson criterion, the energy of accidental collisions within the plasma is high enough to overcome the Coulomb barrier and the particles may fuse together.

In a deuterium–tritium fusion reaction, for example, the energy necessary to overcome the Coulomb barrier is 0.1 MeV. Converting between energy and temperature shows that the 0.1 MeV barrier would be overcome at a temperature in excess of 1.2 billion kelvin.

There are two effects that are needed to lower the actual temperature. One is the fact that temperature is the average kinetic energy, implying that some nuclei at this temperature would actually have much higher energy than 0.1 MeV, while others would be much lower. It is the nuclei in the high-energy tail of the velocity distribution that account for most of the fusion reactions. The other effect is quantum tunnelling. The nuclei do not actually have to have enough energy to overcome the Coulomb barrier completely. If they have nearly enough energy, they can tunnel through the remaining barrier. For these reasons fuel at lower temperatures will still undergo fusion events, at a lower rate.

Thermonuclear fusion is one of the methods being researched in the attempts to produce fusion power. If thermonuclear fusion becomes favorable to use, it would significantly reduce the world's carbon footprint.

Confinement
The key problem in achieving thermonuclear fusion is how to confine the hot plasma. Due to the high temperature, the plasma cannot be in direct contact with any solid material, so it has to be located in a vacuum. Also, high temperatures imply high pressures. The plasma tends to expand immediately and some force is necessary to act against it. This force can take one of three forms: gravitation in stars, magnetic forces in magnetic confinement fusion reactors, or inertial as the fusion reaction may occur before the plasma starts to expand, so the plasma's inertia is keeping the material together.

Gravitational confinement 

One force capable of confining the fuel well enough to satisfy the Lawson criterion is gravity. The mass needed, however, is so great that gravitational confinement is only found in stars—the least massive stars capable of sustained fusion are red dwarfs, while brown dwarfs are able to fuse deuterium and lithium if they are of sufficient mass. In stars heavy enough, after the supply of hydrogen is exhausted in their cores, their cores (or a shell around the core) start fusing helium to carbon. In the most massive stars (at least 8–11 solar masses), the process is continued until some of their energy is produced by fusing lighter elements to iron. As iron has one of the highest binding energies, reactions producing heavier elements are generally endothermic. Therefore significant amounts of heavier elements are not formed during stable periods of massive star evolution, but are formed in supernova explosions. Some lighter stars also form these elements in the outer parts of the stars over long periods of time, by absorbing energy from fusion in the inside of the star, by absorbing neutrons that are emitted from the fusion process.

All of the elements heavier than iron have some potential energy to release, in theory. At the extremely heavy end of element production, these heavier elements can produce energy in the process of being split again back toward the size of iron, in the process of nuclear fission. Nuclear fission thus releases energy that has been stored, sometimes billions of years before, during stellar nucleosynthesis.

Magnetic confinement 

Electrically charged particles (such as fuel ions) will follow magnetic field lines (see Guiding centre). The fusion fuel can therefore be trapped using a strong magnetic field. A variety of magnetic configurations exist, including the toroidal geometries of tokamaks and stellarators and open-ended mirror confinement systems.

Inertial confinement 

A third confinement principle is to apply a rapid pulse of energy to a large part of the surface of a pellet of fusion fuel, causing it to simultaneously "implode" and heat to very high pressure and temperature. If the fuel is dense enough and hot enough, the fusion reaction rate will be high enough to burn a significant fraction of the fuel before it has dissipated. To achieve these extreme conditions, the initially cold fuel must be explosively compressed. Inertial confinement is used in the hydrogen bomb, where the driver is x-rays created by a fission bomb. Inertial confinement is also attempted in "controlled" nuclear fusion, where the driver is a laser, ion, or electron beam, or a Z-pinch. Another method is to use conventional high explosive material to compress a fuel to fusion conditions. The UTIAS explosive-driven-implosion facility was used to produce stable, centred and focused hemispherical implosions to generate neutrons from D-D reactions. The simplest and most direct method proved to be in a predetonated stoichiometric mixture of deuterium-oxygen. The other successful method was using a miniature Voitenko compressor, where a plane diaphragm was driven by the implosion wave into a secondary small spherical cavity that contained pure deuterium gas at one atmosphere.

Electrostatic confinement 

There are also electrostatic confinement fusion devices. These devices confine ions using electrostatic fields. The best known is the fusor. This device has a cathode inside an anode wire cage. Positive ions fly towards the negative inner cage, and are heated by the electric field in the process. If they miss the inner cage they can collide and fuse. Ions typically hit the cathode, however, creating prohibitory high conduction losses. Also, fusion rates in fusors are very low due to competing physical effects, such as energy loss in the form of light radiation. Designs have been proposed to avoid the problems associated with the cage, by generating the field using a non-neutral cloud. These include a plasma oscillating device, a Penning trap and the polywell. The technology is relatively immature, however, and many scientific and engineering questions remain.

See also
Thermonuclear weapon
 Fusion power
 Nuclear fusion

References

Nuclear fusion
Neutron sources